Kushki Torkaman (also Romanized as Kūshkī Torkaman) is a village in Atrak Rural District, Maneh District, Maneh and Samalqan County, North Khorasan Province, Iran. At the 2006 census, its population was 846, in 193 families.

References 

Populated places in Maneh and Samalqan County